Ian Ross Harper  AO FASSA FAICD is an Australian economist, economics professor and current dean of the Melbourne Business School.

Harper has a Bachelor of Economics with honours from the University of Queensland and a Master of Economics and Doctor of Philosophy from the Australian National University. Before becoming the dean, he was Professor emeritus at the Melbourne Business School, a graduate school of the University of Melbourne.

Career 

Harper began his career working at the Reserve bank, after completion of his PhD. He was the inaugural chairman of the Australian Fair Pay Commission before that body was abolished in 2009. He then joined Deloitte's Melbourne office as a partner, and then senior adviser. He headed the Federal Government's Competition Review, releasing the final report ("the Competition Policy Review" or "Harper Review")    of 56 recommendations on 31 March 2015. He was appointed to the board of the Reserve Bank in 2016  before returning to academia as the Dean of the Melbourne Business School, in 2018.

Published works 

Harper has published numerous articles, and recently wrote Economics for life which won the 2011 SPCK Australian Christian Book of the Year Award.

Honours
Harper was elected to the Australian Fellowship of the Academy of Social Sciences in 2000 and later elected to the Fellowship of the Australian Institute of Company Directors.

Harper was made an Officer of the Order of Australia in the 2020 Queen's Birthday Honours, "for distinguished service to education in the field of economics, and to public and monetary policy development and reform."

Personal life
Harper is a professing Christian and often speaks publicly about his Christian faith.

References

External links
Talk on ABC Radio

Australian economists
Living people
Academic staff of the University of Melbourne
University of Queensland alumni
Australian National University alumni
Fellows of the Academy of the Social Sciences in Australia
Fellows of the Australian Institute of Company Directors
Year of birth missing (living people)
Officers of the Order of Australia
Australian Christians